Orelec  (Orelets’) is a village in the administrative district of Gmina Olszanica, within Lesko County, Subcarpathian Voivodeship, in south-eastern Poland.

The village has a population of 420.

References

Villages in Lesko County